The 2020 Kentucky Wildcats softball team represents the University of Kentucky in the 2020 NCAA Division I softball season. The Wildcats play their home games at John Cropp Stadium.

Previous season

The Wildcats finished the 2019 season 36–24 overall, and 14–10 in the SEC to finish in a tie for second in the conference. The Wildcats hosted a regional during the 2019 NCAA Division I softball tournament and later advanced to the Seattle Super Regional against Washington. The Wildcats were defeated by the Huskies 0 games to 2 as the Huskies advanced to the WCWS.

Preseason

SEC preseason poll
The SEC preseason poll was released on January 15, 2020.

Schedule and results

Source:
*Rankings are based on the team's current ranking in the NFCA poll.

Rankings

References

Kentucky
Kentucky Wildcats softball seasons
Kentucky Wildcats softball